USS LST-5 was an  of the United States Navy built during World War II. She was transferred to the Royal Navy in December 1944. Like many of her class, she was not named and is properly referred to by her hull designation.

Construction
LST-5 was laid down on 12 July 1942, at Pittsburgh, Pennsylvania by the Dravo Corporation; launch on 3 October 1942; sponsored by Mrs. Wanetta Rose Barker; and commissioned on 22 February 1943.

USN service history
During LST-5s involvement in World War II, she served in the Mediterranean Theater and European Theater and participated in the following operations: the Allied invasion of Sicily in July 1943; the Salerno Landings in September 1943; and the Invasion of Normandy in June 1944.

Royal Navy service
LST-5 was decommissioned from the USN on 17 November 1944, and commissioned into the Royal Navy the next day as HM LST-5. She was refit at Belfast, from 22 January to 11 April 1945, before sailing for service in the Far East the following summer. On 19 February 1946, she was decommissioned from the RN.

Final disposition
LST-5 was struck from the Navy list on 1 August 1947. On 7 October 1947, she was sold to the Tung Hwa Trading Co., Singapore, for scrapping.

References

Bibliography

External links

 

 

LST-1-class tank landing ships of the United States Navy
Ships built in Pittsburgh
1942 ships
World War II amphibious warfare vessels of the United States
LST-1-class tank landing ships of the Royal Navy
World War II amphibious warfare vessels of the United Kingdom
Ships built by Dravo Corporation